Epsilon Minus was the debut album by Epsilon Minus, released in 2002 on the Alfa Matrix label. It was also released as a deluxe edition with a bonus disc. The track "Power Down" was later released as a bonus track on the limited edition version Hearts for Bullets, an album by Jennifer Parkin's solo project Ayria.

Track listing
 "Introduction (EM Anthem)" – 1:42
 "Freedom" - 7:14
 "Antigravity" - 4:07
 "Transition (The Clock Is Ticking)" - 0:30
 "Wasted Years" - 4:20
 "Through" - 3:55
 "Faceless Whispers" - 4:22
 "Lost" - 4:48
 "Protection" - 4:28
 "Chiba City Blues" - 4:38
 "Power Down" - 4:15
 "Faceless Whispers (Hallucinate)" - 4:07
 "Freedom (Restriction)" - 5:27
 "Nothing Is Indestructible" - 6:42
 "Untitled" - 6:48
 "Untitled" - 0:47
 "Untitled" - 0:33

Bonus Disc
 "Antigravity" (Implant Mix) - 5:15
 "Through" (Glis Mix) - 5:24
 "Faceless Whispers" (GASR Mix) - 4:43
 "A Dark Background" - 3:51
 "Freedom" (Stromkern Mix) - 6:43
 "Nothing Is Indestructible" (Neikka RPM Mix) - 4:49
 "Antigravity" (cXe) - 3:59

References

2002 albums